Paron School District No. 2 was a school district headquartered in Paron, an unincorporated area in Saline County, Arkansas, United States.

It operated Paron Elementary School (K-6) and Paron High School (7-12).

On July 1, 2004, it merged into the Bryant School District. This merger occurred due to a state law which required a school district with fewer than 350 students to merge with another school district. At the time the district's fund balance was decreasing in size, and the state was about to rule the district as being in financial distress.

References

Further reading
 Maps of the district
 Map of Arkansas School Districts pre-July 1, 2004
  (Download) - Includes the boundary of the Paron district

External links
 "Paron School District No. 2  Saline County, Arkansas Basic Financial Statements and Other Reports June 30, 2004 ."

Defunct school districts in Arkansas
Education in Saline County, Arkansas
2004 disestablishments in Arkansas
School districts disestablished in 2004